Big Read  is the Hungarian version of the BBC Big Read.

The Big Read was imported into Hungary under the name A Nagy Könyv (lit. "The Big Book") and took place in 2005.  Around 1400 libraries, 500 book shops and 1300 schools participated in the competition in various ways. It proved to be far more popular in Hungary (with a population of 10 million) than in the UK (with a population of 60 million), with 400,000 votes arriving (as opposed to 140,000 votes in the UK competition in the corresponding period).

Voting for the top 100 began in late February: one was allowed to vote for any novel published in Hungarian. It ended on April 23, when the 50 "foreign" and 50 Hungarian most popular novels were selected.

On June 11, the top 12 novels were chosen in the framework of a television show presented by cultural celebrities. In the next months, 12 short films were made from these novels and screened in television, which competed with each other in pairs.

On December 15, the population selected their ultimate favourite by SMS and phone. The winning novel, which received the title "the most liked novel of Hungary 2005", was the same book as the result of the previous round, Eclipse of the Crescent Moon. The other two Hungarian books that participated in the final were The Paul Street Boys and Abigél.

Initial Top 12
 Eclipse of the Crescent Moon (literally Stars of Eger) by Géza Gárdonyi
 The Paul Street Boys by Ferenc Molnár
 The Lord of the Rings by J. R. R. Tolkien
 Winnie-the-Pooh by A. A. Milne
 The Little Prince by A. de Saint-Exupéry
 Abigél by Magda Szabó
 Harry Potter and the Philosopher's Stone by J. K. Rowling
 Tüskevár by István Fekete
 Nineteen Eighty-Four by George Orwell
 The Master and Margarita by Mikhail Bulgakov
 The Man with the Golden Touch (Az arany ember) by Mór Jókai
 One Hundred Years of Solitude by Gabriel García Márquez

Final Top 100

 Eclipse of the Crescent Moon by Géza Gárdonyi
 The Paul Street Boys by Ferenc Molnár
 Abigél by Magda Szabó
 Nineteen Eighty-Four by George Orwell
 The Man with the Golden Touch (Az arany ember) by Mór Jókai
 Winnie-the-Pooh by A. A. Milne
 The Little Prince by A. de Saint-Exupéry
 The Lord of the Rings by J. R. R. Tolkien
 Harry Potter and the Philosopher's Stone by J. K. Rowling
 The Master and Margarita by Mikhail Bulgakov
 Tüskevár by István Fekete
 One Hundred Years of Solitude by Gabriel García Márquez
 Abel Alone by Áron Tamási
 The Baron's Sons by Mór Jókai
 Indul a bakterház by Sándor Rideg
 Harry Potter and the Prisoner of Azkaban by J. K. Rowling
 Harry Potter and the Chamber of Secrets by J. K. Rowling
 Be Faithful Unto Death by Zsigmond Móricz
 Vuk: The Little Fox by István Fekete
 The Old Man and the Sea by Ernest Hemingway
 Lottie and Lisa by Erich Kästner
 Gone with the Wind by Margaret Mitchell
 Les Misérables by Victor Hugo
 The Count of Monte Cristo by Alexandre Dumas
 A funtineli boszorkány by Albert Wass
 Harry Potter and the Order of the Phoenix by J. K. Rowling
 Fateless by Imre Kertész
 The Three Musketeers by Alexandre Dumas
 Kincskereső kisködmön by Ferenc Móra
 Quo Vadis by Henryk Sienkiewicz
 Give Me Back My Mountains by Albert Wass
 Embers by Sándor Márai
 Pansy Violet by Zsigmond Móricz
 Crime and Punishment by Fyodor Dostoevsky
 St. Peter's Umbrella by Kálmán Mikszáth
 Jane Eyre by Charlotte Brontë
 Dirty Fred the Captain by Jenő Rejtő
 Slave of the Huns by Géza Gárdonyi
 Wuthering Heights by Emily Brontë
 A nap szerelmese by Sándor Dallos
 The Red and the Black by Stendhal
 The Catcher in the Rye by J. D. Salinger
 Anna Édes by Dezső Kosztolányi
 Catch-22 by Joseph Heller
 Thistle by István Fekete
 Lord of the Flies by William Golding
 The 14-Carat Roadster by Jenő Rejtő
 Aranyecset by Sándor Dallos
 Lassie Come-Home by Eric Knight
 Winnetou by Karl May
 Téli berek by István Fekete
 War and Peace by Leo Tolstoy
 For Whom the Bell Tolls by Ernest Hemingway
 Pride and Prejudice by Jane Austen
 The Gold Coffin by Ferenc Móra
 A fekete város by Kálmán Mikszáth
 The Princess Diaries by Meg Cabot
 Tóték by István Örkény
 Flowers for Algernon by Daniel Keyes
 Állítsátok meg Terézanyut! by Zsuzsa Rácz
 The Name of the Rose by Umberto Eco
 Robinson Crusoe by Daniel Defoe
 Death is My Trade by Robert Merle
 The Da Vinci Code by Dan Brown
 East of Eden by John Steinbeck
 The Good Soldier Švejk by Jaroslav Hašek
 The Young Lions by Irwin Shaw
 Kard és kasza by Albert Wass
 The Pillars of the Earth by Ken Follett
 Arch of Triumph by Erich Maria Remarque
 School at the Frontier by Géza Ottlik
 A Hungarian Nabob by Mór Jókai
 This Above All by Eric Knight
 Revulsion by László Németh
 A Farewell to Arms by Ernest Hemingway
 Anna Karenina by Leo Tolstoy
 A Journey Round My Skull by Frigyes Karinthy
 The Hitchhiker's Guide to the Galaxy by Douglas Adams
 Love in the Time of Cholera by Gabriel García Márquez
 The Book of Fathers by Miklós Vámos
 The Pendragon Legend by Antal Szerb
 Bezzeg az én időmben by Klára Fehér
 Gergő és az álomfogók by Gyula Böszörményi
 Malevil by Robert Merle
 The Alchemist by Paulo Coelho
 Für Elise by Magda Szabó
 Journey by Moonlight by Antal Szerb
 Jadwiga's Pillow by Pál Závada
 Ida's Novel by Géza Gárdonyi
 The Magic Mountain by Thomas Mann
 An Old-fashioned Story by Magda Szabó
 The Unbearable Lightness of Being by Milan Kundera
 The Door by Magda Szabó
 The Confessions of a Haut-Bourgeois by Sándor Márai
 The Red Lion by Mária Szepes
 Joseph and His Brothers by Thomas Mann
 Ne féljetek by Anna Jókai
 My Happy Days in Hell by György Faludy
 PetePite by Gábor Nógrádi
 Celestial Harmonies by Péter Esterházy

Authors by number of novels in the Top 100
Four novels: István Fekete, J. K. Rowling, Magda Szabó
Three novels: Géza Gárdonyi, Ernest Hemingway, Mór Jókai, Albert Wass
Two novels: Sándor Dallos, Alexandre Dumas, Eric Knight, Thomas Mann, Sándor Márai, Gabriel García Márquez, Robert Merle, Kálmán Mikszáth, Ferenc Móra, Zsigmond Móricz, Jenő Rejtő, Antal Szerb, Leo Tolstoy

See also
Contests similar to Big Read were held in other countries:
Das große Lesen in Germany
Голямото четене ("The Big Read") in Bulgaria

References

External links
BBC Big Read website

Hungarian literary awards
Lists of novels